United Shoe Machinery Corporation (USMC) was a U.S.-based manufacturer of various industrial machinery, particularly for the shoe manufacturing industry and monopolized the American shoe machinery business. It was an important federal government's defense contractor during the World War I, Interbellum years, World War II and the Cold war era, which developed and manufactured various land and aircraft armaments, as well as components for the military hardware made by other manufacturers. Founded in Beverly, Massachusetts, its corporate headquarters were eventually relocated to Boston, with key production facilities scattered around Massachusetts. It had subsidiaries in other countries including British United Shoe Machinery in England.

History
The Smithsonian National Museum of American History provides the following account of the history of the United Shoe Machinery Corporation. 
The United Shoe Machinery Company was formed in 1899 by the consolidation of three shoe machinery firms in the industry: Goodyear Shoe Machinery Company; Consolidated McKay Lasting Machine Company; and McKay Shoe Machinery Company. The new company continued the practice previously followed by its constituent firms of renting machinery that it manufactured instead of selling it. After the 1899 merger, United grew quite rapidly. In 1903, it began construction of a new factory in Beverly, Massachusetts about thirty-five miles from Boston. At its peak, this company employed 9,000 workers and produced eighty-five percent of all shoemaking machines in the United States. By 1910, it had an eighty percent share of the shoe machinery market with assets reaching forty million dollars, and it had acquired control of branch companies in foreign countries. In 1917, the United Shoe Machinery Corporation, incorporated in 1905, absorbed the United Shoe Machinery Company. The United Shoe Machinery Corporation had its headquarters in Boston and its main manufacturing plant in Beverly, Massachusetts. In 1968, the United Shoe Machinery Corporation changed its name to USM Corporation. In 1976, United Shoe Machinery Company merged with Emhart Industries and produced the modern-day Emhart Corporation. In 1989, in order to resist a two billion dollar takeover attempt by a New York investment group (which included oil heir Gordon P. Getty), Emhart merged with Black & Decker Corporation. The merged company operates from Black & Decker's headquarters in Towson, Maryland. The company headquarters in Farmington, Connecticut, were closed in June 1989.

In December 1947 the US government brought proceedings against USM alleging a breach of the Sherman Antitrust Act in that the company had been a monopoly since 1912.  A "trial of prodigious length" followed but although the verdict went against USM, the corporation wasn't broken up and the judgement and remedy was confirmed by the Supreme Court in 1954. The government renewed its complaint in 1967 but although the District Court ruled nothing had changed, this time the Supreme Court ordered USM to be broken up. It was required to divest a substantial part of its business and change its leasing strategy over a 10-year period, with the sell-off raising $400 million. It continued to innovate within the shoe manufacturing industry, but it also developed such modern inventions as the hot glue gun, the soda can pop-top, the drive mechanism for the lunar module, and pop rivets for the Concorde. However, the attempts at diversification failed to generate enough money and in 1976 the company, heavily in debt, was bought by Emhart Corporation, now Stanley Engineered Fastening, an organisation half its size.

In 1987 a management buyout led by the management of British United Shoe Machinery (BUSM) bought the shoe machinery operations, including USM, from Emhart Industries and control of USM then passed to the U.K. as part of the newly created United Machinery Group (UMG). Subsequently, the USM headquarters moved into a new high-tech factory outside Boston. In 1995 UMG was acquired by Venture Capitalists Apax Partners Corporate Finance Limited, but after financial difficulties UMG went into administration in 2000.

Research and development
The corporation pioneered the development and production of a synthetic leather materials.

During the Interbellum era corporate Research Division designed and developed gun mounts, gun turrets, fire control equipment, automatic guns, automatic fuse setting, bomb release equipment, automatic conveying equipment, and automatic rocket projectors, as well as many other things of military interest.

During the postwar years, the corporate engineers experimented intensively with armoured fighting vehicles of modular design, kindred by common chassis, common armor elements, interchangeable armament, automatic loading for weapons, and low weight in order to attain high speeds, coupled with various comfort add-ons provided for the housed crew.

Production items
 Armoured fighting vehicles
 T54E1 medium tank
 Turtle-series, IVI prototype gun motor carriages (33 tons, tracked, turreted, 4-man crew situated below the upper hull line, 600-hp engine, armor thickness 3 to 6 inches, dimensions: 18'7" long, 9'4" wide, 7' tall, carrying various promptly interchangeable turrets, different main armament with automatic feed system; plus twin 30 mm driver's coaxial machine gun, one .30 caliber commander's machinegun, and one .50 caliber AA machinegun each; weapon stabilization in addition to driver stabilization, internal air cleaning and air conditioning systems)
 IVI Gun Motor Carriage, quadruple .50 caliber machine gun (main)
 IVI-C Gun Motor Carriage, twin 37 mm guns
 IVI-D Gun Motor Carriage, single-barrel 75 mm tank gun (gunner's compartment separated from the crew compartment, allowing the gunner to move with the weapon in elevation and in azimuth)
 prototype heavy armored combat vehicles with oscillating turret
 prototype armored combat vehicles with externally mounted main gun
 Gun turrets and armament
 tank turrets
 T20E1 (Fisher Body Div. of General Motors) Medium Tank turret mounting the 76 mm M1 gun with an autoloader
 T22E1 (Chrysler's DTA) Medium Tank turret mounting the 75 mm M3 gun equipped with an autoloader
 T77 Gun Motor Carriage multibarrel .50 caliber machine gun mount T89
 High Speed Harmonic Drive Speed Reducer for slow and stabilized rotation of shipboard or tank heavy gun turrets
 tank guns
 37 mm tank gun M5

 Infantry weapons and artillery pieces
 37 mm antitank gun M3
 37 mm towed antitank gun carriage
 shell ramming
 fuze setting devices

 Weapon systems
 aircraft gun turrets
 B-17 Flying Fortress ball turret
 YA-14 Shrike and XP-71 pressurized turret
 waist gun mounts
 XB-40 Flying Fortress and XB-41 Liberator power-operated M5 waist gun mounts
 remote hydraulic controls for special M2 machine gun installations for aircraft
 gas-piston operated guns
 machined items for attack and utility helicopters (e.g. UH-1 Iroquois)

 Aerospace equipment
 machined items for military satellites (Telstar)
 Industrial machinery
 electronic component assembly machines
 automatic assembly machines for assembling military radar sets

Structure

The corporation had several divisions, subsidiaries and affiliates, which were located mainly in Massachusetts.

See also

Jan Ernst Matzeliger
United Shoe Machinery Corporation Building
United Shoe Machinery Corporation Clubhouse

References

Books

External links

Defense companies of the United States
Historic American Engineering Record in Massachusetts
Industrial machine manufacturers
Shoemaking
Companies based in Beverly, Massachusetts
American companies established in 1899
Manufacturing companies established in 1899